Jeeva may refer to:

People 
 Jeeva or P. Jeevanandham (1907–1963), Indian politician
 Jeeva (director) (1963–2007), Tamil movie director
 Jeeva (Telugu actor) (born 1952), Indian actor
 Jiiva (born 1984), Indian Tamil actor
 Jeeva (artist) (born 1956), Tamil painter, film critic and art designer from Tamil Nadu, India
 Lollu Sabha Jeeva, Lollu Sabha actor
 Chiranjeevi (born 1955), Indian film actor and politician

Other uses
 Jeeva (1986 film), Hindi film from India, starring Sanjay Dutt and Mandakini
 Jeeva (1988 film), Tamil film from India, starring Sathyaraj and Amala
 Jeeva (1995 film), from Pakistan
 Jeeva (2009 film), a Kannada film
 Jeeva (2014 film), Tamil film from India, starring Vishnu and Sri Divya
 Alternate spelling of Jiva, a concept in Hinduism and Jainism

See also
Jiva (disambiguation)